Hanna Hipp is a Polish lyric mezzo-soprano.

Hipp trained at the Stanisław Moniuszko  in Gdańsk, the Guildhall School of Music and Drama and the National Opera Studio.

Hipp was a member of The Royal Opera's Jette Parker Young Artist Programme, and for the 2018/19 season she sings Hansel in Humperdinck's Hansel and Gretel.

She sang the title role in Fantasio by Offenbach at the 2019 Garsington festival, one critic noting that along with her "good-humoured energy" she allowed her "plangent mezzo-soprano drive Fantasio's emotional journey".

References

External links

Hanna Hipp at Operabase

Living people
Year of birth missing (living people)
Place of birth missing (living people)
21st-century Polish women opera singers
Operatic mezzo-sopranos